Zubr may refer to:
Żubr or Zubr, the name in several Slavic languages for the wisent or European bison (Bison bonasus)
Zubr (political organization), a civic youth organization in Belarus
Zubr, a novel by Daniil Granin
TOZ-55 "Zubr", a Soviet hunting rifle
Zubr-class LCAC, a Russian hovercraft
Żubr (beer), a Polish brand of beer
Zubr, a Czech brewery and brand of beer
HC Zubr Přerov, an ice hockey club sponsored by the brewery
Zubr, a village near Daugavpils in modern Latvia
LWS-6 Żubr, a Polish aircraft
AMZ Żubr, a Polish armored car
Zubr (special police force), the riot police of Moscow